John Caponera (born 1959) is an American comedian and actor. He starred in the 1994 TV series The Good Life with Drew Carey as Caponera's co-star. (Carey recalls Caponera as "one of the nicest, funniest, and hardest-working guys I've ever known".)  Caponera's Harry Caray impersonation is one of his trademark bits. His material receives frequent airplay on XM Radio comedy channels.

Caponera played the part of Dave in the Bryan Spicer film For Richer or Poorer, starring Tim Allen and Kirstie Alley, as well as dozens of other acting parts.

CDs and cassettes
 Comedy Comin' at Ya (1998), ASIN B00000AE88
 Live at Hilarities
 Rain Delay (2006)
 Total Sports Comedy

References

External links
John Caponera's official site

American stand-up comedians
Living people
1959 births
20th-century American comedians
21st-century American comedians
American male comedians
20th-century American male actors
Male actors from Chicago
Comedians from Illinois